In computer engineering, STAPL may refer to:
 the C++ Standard Template Adaptive Parallel Library
 JEDEC standard JESD-71, Altera's JAM/STAPL Standard Test and Programming Language.